Mansion House (also referred to as Ellarslie and McCall House) is a historic residence located in Trenton, Mercer County, New Jersey, United States. The house was built as a summer residence for Henry McCall Sr. of Philadelphia in 1848, and is one of the earliest examples of Italianate architecture in the United States.

Since 1978 the building has been home to the Trenton City Museum, which features collections of decorative and fine arts.

The building was added to the National Register of Historic Places on February 6, 1973.

See also
National Register of Historic Places listings in Mercer County, New Jersey

References

External links
 Trenton City Museum at Ellarslie

Houses in Trenton, New Jersey
Houses completed in 1845
Houses on the National Register of Historic Places in New Jersey
Italianate architecture in New Jersey
National Register of Historic Places in Trenton, New Jersey
Museums in Trenton, New Jersey
History museums in New Jersey
New Jersey Register of Historic Places